The Little Zab or Lower Zab (al-Zāb al-Asfal;  or ; , Zâb-e Kuchak; , Zāba Taḥtāya) is a river that originates in Iran and joins the Tigris just south of Al Zab in the Kurdistan region of Iraq. The river is fed by rainfall and snowmelt, resulting in a peak discharge in spring and low water in summer and early fall. Two dams have been built on the Little Zab, regulating the river flow, providing water for irrigation and generating hydroelectricity. The Zagros Mountains have been occupied since at least the Lower Palaeolithic, but the earliest archaeological site in the Little Zab basin, Barda Balka, dates to the Middle Palaeolithic. Human occupation of the Little Zab basin has been attested for every period since then.

Course 
The Little Zab rises in the Zagros Mountains in Iran at an elevation of circa  amsl. In its upper reaches, the course of the Little Zab is determined by the alignment of the major mountain chains that make up the Zagros. Thus, the river flows through valleys that are predominantly aligned along a northwest–southeast axis, parallel to the major mountain chains of the Zagros, only to change its direction abruptly where it cuts through these chains in narrow gorges. Along the way, it collects the waters coming down from the eastern face of the Qandil Mountains, which now form the border between Iran and Iraq. The Little Zab enters the Mesopotamian plain south of Dukan, where it first assumes a roughly westward course before turning to the southwest upstream from the town of Altun Kopru and uniting with the Tigris near the town of Al Zab. Most tributaries join the Little Zab upstream from Dukan, with the largest being the Baneh River and the Qala Chulan. A number of smaller streams joined the Little Zab in the Ranya Plain, which is now partly inundated by Lake Dukan.

For a short distance, the Little Zab forms the border between Iran and Iraq, and along its lower course it also constitutes the border between Erbil Governorate and Sulaymaniyah Governorate, and Erbil and Kirkuk Governorates. The river is fed by snowmelt and rainfall, resulting in a peak discharge in the period February–May. Low water levels are recorded for the period July–October. Because of its torrential nature, Medieval Arab geographers have described the Little Zab, and the Great Zab as well, as "demoniacally possessed".

Watershed 
The larger part of the basin (74%) is located within Iraqi borders; the remainder is in Iran. On the north, it is bordered by the Great Zab basin while on the south it is adjoined by the basins of the Adhaim and Diyala rivers. Water erosion has filled the Little Zab valley and the foothill zone south-west of the Zagros with layers of gravel, conglomerate, and sandstone. The Ranya Plain is the largest valley in the Little Zab drainage basin, and the second-largest in the Iraqi Zagros behind the Shahrazor.

The Little Zab crosses very diverse climatic and ecological zones. Average temperatures follow a similar gradient, with the mountain valleys generally experiencing colder winters than the foothill zone, while summers in the latter are hotter. In the high Zagros, three different biomes can be distinguished. The river valleys are characterized by water-loving plants, and marshy areas were in the past – in the absence of drainage – prone to malaria. Although the foothill zone, especially the plain of Erbil, is heavily cultivated, patches of natural vegetation remain, with herbs in the genus Phlomis being very common.

River modifications 

Two dams have been constructed on the Little Zab in Iraq while Iran is currently constructing one with two others planned. The two in Iraq are the Dukan Dam and the Dibis Dam. The Dukan Dam was constructed between 1957 and 1961 as a multi-purpose arch dam upstream from the town of Dukan. Its functions are to regulate the flow of the Little Zab, to store water for irrigation in its reservoir (Lake Dukan) and to provide hydroelectric power. Because the flooding of Lake Dukan would lead to the submersion of numerous archaeological sites, an archaeological survey and rescue excavations were carried out in the endangered region – notably at the sites of Tell Shemshara and Tell Bazmusian. Currently under construction in Iran is the Sardasht Dam. Above the Sardasht Dam, Iran is planning to construct the Shivahan and Garjhal Dams with the primary purpose of power generation.

This competes with need for the water in Kurdistan Region in Iraq.

History 

Although Iraqi Kurdistan is not well known from an archaeological point of view, the available evidence nevertheless shows that the relatively favourable ecological conditions of the Iraqi part of the Zagros attracted human groups from early prehistory onwards. Lower Palaeolithic archaeological sites have to date not been found in the Iraqi part of the Zagros Mountains, but they are known from the Iranian side where numerous cave sites have been found during archaeological surveys. Information on the early prehistory of the wider Little Zab region itself comes from the excavations carried out by the Oriental Institute at archaeological sites east of Kirkuk and south of the Little Zab. The earliest evidence for human occupation in this region comes from the Middle Palaeolithic site of Barda Balka, where Late Acheulean stone tools have been found. Archaeological research elsewhere in the Zagros confirms the importance of this area to early human hunter-gatherers – including groups of Neanderthals as evidenced by the finds in Shanidar Cave in the Great Zab basin. Mousterian stone tools that were used by either Neanderthals or anatomically modern humans have recently been excavated in Erbil, between the Little Zab and the Great Zab. Both open-air and cave sites are attested for the Zarzian culture, which straddles the Upper and Epipalaeolithic periods. After the Zarzian, the focus of human occupation shifted from cave-sites, which continue to be used as secondary or seasonal occupation sites up to today, to open-air sites and it was in this period that the trend toward domestication of plants and animals set in. Domestication of the goat probably occurred first in this area of the Zagros. Jarmo, a tell east of Kirkuk, was a Neolithic village community that practiced agriculture and animal husbandry. Pottery occurs from the early occupation levels onward; in its later phases it resembles pottery from Hassuna. The early occupation of Tell Shemshara, in the Ranya Plain, can also be dated to this period. The archaeological fieldwork in the Ranya Plain showed that this area was occupied during the Ubaid, Uruk and Ninevite V periods – roughly from the middle 6th to the mid-3rd millennium BCE. Evidence for these periods comes from the Citadel of Erbil as well.

The region enters history at the end of the 3rd millennium BCE, when Erbil is mentioned as Urbilum by king Shulgi of the Ur III dynasty. From that time onward, the Little Zab basin became increasingly entangled in the affairs of the successive Mesopotamian empires that sought control over the Zagros Mountains. In the early second millennium BCE, king Shamshi-Adad of Upper Mesopotamia waged war to the land of Qabra, which was probably located along the lower course of the Little Zab, and installed garrisons in the conquered towns. The archive of clay tablets found at Tell Shemshara (ancient Shusharra) shows that the local governor switched allegiance and became a vassal of Shamshi-Adad. During the 14th century BCE, the region was part of the Mitannian kingdom, with sites like Nuzi and Tell al-Fakhar, south of the Little Zab, yielding clay tablet archives for this period. During the late second–early first millennia BCE, the lower Little Zab basin belonged to the heartland of the Middle Assyrian and Neo-Assyrian empires. After the fall of the Neo-Assyrian Empire, control of the Zagros shifted first to the Medes and in 550 BCE to the Achaemenid Empire. The last Achaemenid ruler Darius III was defeated by Alexander the Great at the Battle of Gaugamela in northern Iraq and after Alexander's death in 323, the area fell to his Seleucid successors.

On the Ortelius Theatrum Orbis Terrarum maps of Turkish Empire and Persian Kingdom it is listed as Noue aque fl.

See also 

Tigris–Euphrates river system

References

Citations

Bibliography

Rivers of Iran
Rivers of Iraq
Rivers of Kurdistan
Tributaries of the Tigris River
International rivers of Asia
Geography of Iraqi Kurdistan
Erbil Governorate
Kirkuk Governorate
Kurdistan Province
Sulaymaniyah Governorate
Iran–Iraq border